Stanley Kowalski is a fictional character in Tennessee Williams' play A Streetcar Named Desire.

In the play
Stanley lives in the working-class Faubourg Marigny neighborhood of New Orleans with his wife, Stella (  DuBois), and is employed as a factory parts salesman. He was an Army engineer in World War II, having served as a Master Sergeant. He is a controlling, hard-edged man, with no discernible capacity for empathy, forgiveness, or patience, and no apparent family ties of his own, although he once mentions a cousin. He also has a vicious temper and fights with his wife, sometimes leading to instances of domestic violence, which mirror those of the older married couple who live upstairs, the Hubbells. Near the beginning of the play, Stanley announces that Stella is pregnant.

Stanley's life becomes more complicated when Stella's sister Blanche shows up at their door for a seemingly indefinite "visit". He resents the genteel Blanche, who derides him as an "ape", and calls him a "Polack". She flirts with him but attempts behind his back to get Stella to leave the marriage, intensifying his resentment. She poses a threat, in his mind to both his regimented but hedonistic lifestyle and his marriage and concomitant control of his wife. He determines to eliminate this perceived threat and take his revenge.

Stanley starts asking questions from a seedy street merchant, Shaw, who knew Blanche in her old life. Stanley already knows Blanche is staying with the Kowalskis because she is homeless; her family's ancestral mansion, Belle Reve, has been mortgaged. He learns from Shaw that she was paid to leave Mississippi to quell gossip about her many affairs, which she began after her husband, a closeted homosexual, committed suicide. Overjoyed to have the upper hand, Stanley tells Mitch about Blanche's past, which causes Mitch to end the budding  relationship which would have seen Blanche leave the Kowalski household and marry Mitch and replace his dying mother as the object of his love. Stanley's cruelty infuriates the hapless Stella.

That night, Stella goes to the hospital to give birth. Stanley goes out and gets drunk in celebration, and returns home. He finds a similarly drunk Blanche, lost in fantasies of soon-to-be happy times, benefit of Shep Huntleigh.

Mitch, possibly emboldened himself with some liquor, had earlier visited after Stanley and Stella left, and told Blanche that she was not good enough to meet his mother but demanded some sexual attention as that is all she is apparently good for. She told him to get out or she'd scream fire, and he left.

Stanley drunkenly fondles Blanche, who rejects him and affects a high dudgeon. He traps her in the bedroom and easily disarms her after she breaks a bottle to use as a weapon. She collapses and the scene ends with her impending rape. This final assault on what she had left of her dignity sends Blanche over the edge into a nervous breakdown. Blanche tells Stella but Stanley lies to his wife and denies Blanche's claim. Weeks later, Stella has Blanche committed to a mental institution at Stanley's insistence. 

In the original play, Stella refuses to allow herself to believe Blanche (with the support of Eunice Hubbell) and  stays with Stanley, although she seems to need to convince herself. In the 1951 film adaptation, however, due to the demands of the censors, Stella leaves him and takes their child. Most later film and television versions restore the original ending.

Development
When developing the character, Williams frequently changed what Stanley's ethnicity would be. Originally the story was set in Chicago and he was written as an Italian American named Lucio. Another draft, set in Atlanta, had the character named Ralph and be an Irish American. In order the draft names were: Lucio, Stanley Landowski, Jack, Ralph, Ralph Stanley, and Ralph Kowalski, prior to the final one.

No copies of the play drafts mention what Kowalski's line of work is. According to author  Joseph W. Zurawski, Stanley appeared to be an office worker instead of a blue collar worker.

In other media
He was most famously portrayed by Marlon Brando opposite Jessica Tandy's Blanche in the play's initial Broadway production and, several years later, opposite Vivien Leigh in the 1951 film adaptation. 

Since then the role has been played to varying degrees of acclaim, by, among many others, Anthony Quinn (who succeeded Brando on Broadway and played opposite Tandy's successor, Uta Hagen),
James Farentino (opposite Rosemary Harris) on Broadway in 1973, Treat Williams (in the 1984 TV movie, opposite Ann-Margret), and Alec Baldwin (opposite Jessica Lange, both on Broadway in 1992 and in the 1995 TV movie). 

Aidan Quinn and Christopher Walken both played the role opposite Blythe Danner's Blanche in two different stage productions. The three actors and both productions, however, received mixed to middling reviews.

In 1990, Bruce Payne played a Kowalski-esque character in the music video for Neil Young's song Over and Over, which was directed by Julien Temple.

The real Stanley Kowalski
An actual Stanley Kowalski lived in St. Louis. He was born in 1893 or 1895, served in the U.S. Army in World War I, and died in 1933. He was a shoe-worker. For several years Tennessee Williams worked as a clerk at Continental Shoe in St. Louis. The article “In Search of Stanley Kowalski,” by Stephen Werner goes into detail about what can be known about the real Stanley Kowalski.

Several biographies on Williams describe a close relationship between Williams and Kowalski. However, the known details about Kowalski make this seem unlikely. While working at Continental Shoe, Williams did develop a close friendship with Eddie Zawadzki. Eddie at the time was dating his future wife. It must be pointed out that there is not the remotest indication that the "real" Kowalski bore any brutish similarity to the character that made Marlon Brando a star. Indeed, Stanley is closer to Williams' own father, "a traveling salesman ... a loud, outgoing, hard-drinking, boisterous man who bordered on the vulgar, at least as far as the young, sensitive Tennessee Williams".

References 
 
Werner, Stephen A., “In Search of Stanley Kowalski” St. Louis Cultural History Project (Summer 2022).

Notes 

Characters in plays
Fictional domestic abusers
Fictional rapists
Drama film characters
Theatre characters introduced in 1947
Literary characters introduced in 1947
Fictional World War II veterans
Fictional salespeople
Male literary villains
Male film villains
Male characters in literature
Male characters in theatre
Male characters in film
Fictional Polish-American people